Eurata tisamena is a moth of the subfamily Arctiinae. It was described by Paul Dognin in 1902. It is found in São Paulo, Brazil.

References

 Natural History Museum Lepidoptera generic names catalog

Arctiinae
Moths described in 1902